"Walls" is the third single released by the Australian rock band Flowers, later known as Icehouse. It was released in January 1981, on independent label Regular Records from their debut album, Icehouse, it peaked at #20 on the Australian Kent Music Reoport Singles Charts. It was also released in New Zealand, with a different cover, which was the last release before the band was renamed as Icehouse.

Iva Davies has said that Walls was autobiographical for a period of his life.

The music video was directed by Trevor Hawkins.

Reception
In a single review Cash Box magazine said "Icehouse's Iva Davies entreats the listener to once again enter the Australian band's world of densely textured synth-rock... The title is appropriate enough, as the quartet bursts from a heartbeat rhythm in to wall-like keyboard and guitar hook."

Track listing
All tracks written by Iva Davies.

 "Walls" - 4:22
 "All the Way" - 3:50

Charts

References

1981 singles
Icehouse (band) songs
1980 songs
Songs written by Iva Davies
Chrysalis Records singles
Regular Records singles